The 1917–18 season saw Rochdale compete for their third season in the wartime football league, during World War I. Rochdale competed in the Lancashire section and finished 4th in the Principle Tournament and 10th in the Subsidiary Tournament.

Statistics
	

|}

Competitions

Football League - Lancashire Section

Friendlies

References

Rochdale A.F.C. seasons
Rochdale